Above All is a studio album by pianist Jonny King which was recorded in 2010 and released on the Sunnyside label in 2012.

Reception

Allmusic reviewer Ken Dryden stated: "Above All features him with a veteran rhythm section consisting of bassist Ed Howard and drummer Victor Lewis, with whom he has worked extensively. In his liner notes, King credits his bandmates with contributing suggestions that fine-tuned approaches to his originals, which explains why everything comes together so well ... Recommended".

Track listing 
All compositions by Jonny King
 "The Merry-Go-Round" – 4:42
 "Above All" – 6:08
 "The Wedding Song" – 7:29
 "Lullaby for Cecelia" – 4:29
 "Spindrift" – 4:40
 "Neither Here Nor There" – 5:46
 "Catharsis" – 7:29
 "Like It Is" – 4:29
 "The Shrinkster" – 5:26
 "The Silver Lining" – 5:53
 "Espionage" – 5:20

Personnel 
Performance
Jonny King – piano
Ed Howard – bass
Victor Lewis – drums

Production
Don Sickler, Jonny King – producer
Rudy Van Gelder – engineer

References 

Jonny King albums
2012 albums
Sunnyside Records albums
Albums recorded at Van Gelder Studio